María Casado (born 25 December 1985) is a Spanish rugby sevens player. She was selected for the Spanish women's sevens team to the 2016 Summer Olympics. She also was part of the team that secured the last spot for the Rio Olympics. She played at the 2013 Rugby World Cup Sevens.

References

External links 
 
 

1985 births
Living people
Spain international women's rugby sevens players
Olympic rugby sevens players of Spain
Rugby sevens players at the 2016 Summer Olympics
Sportspeople from the Province of León